A water bottle nipple adapter is a baby bottle nipple that attaches to water bottles, to allow babies and toddlers to drink liquids such as formula, water, or juice.

Versions
There are numerous different versions of baby bottle nipple adapters, such as:
Refresh-a-Baby 
BabySport 
Flipple

References

Bottles
Infant feeding